Apricosiren is an extinct genus of prehistoric salamander. Known from the Berriasian aged Lulworth Formation in southern England.

See also
 Prehistoric amphibian
 List of prehistoric amphibians

References

Cretaceous salamanders
Early Cretaceous amphibians
Cretaceous amphibians of Europe
Fossil taxa described in 2002